The Mercers' Arms was a pub at 17 Mercer Street, in London's Covent Garden, at the corner with Shelton Street. It closed as a pub in about 1973, and is now a private dining club.

The earliest recorded landlord is a Robert Abraham in 1792, and the 1797 insurance document for the then landlord, Alexander Ogston, is held in the National Archives.

References

Covent Garden
Former pubs in London
Pubs in the City of Westminster